is a Japanese former swimmer who competed in the 2000 Summer Olympics and in the 2004 Summer Olympics.

References

1980 births
Living people
Japanese male medley swimmers
Olympic swimmers of Japan
Swimmers at the 2000 Summer Olympics
Swimmers at the 2004 Summer Olympics
21st-century Japanese people